is a Japanese author chiefly known for his mystery novels. He served as the 13th President of Mystery Writers of Japan from 2009 to 2013. Higashino has won major Japanese awards for his books, almost twenty of which have been turned into films and TV series.

Early life 
Higashino was born in the Ikuno-ku ward of the city of Osaka in Osaka Prefecture. The logographic letters that make up the family name were initially read as "Tono", but Keigo's father changed the reading to "Higashino".

Growing up in a working class area, Higashino's childhood was challenging because of the lower class to which his family belonged. He attended Koji Elementary School, Higashi Ikuno Junior High School, and Hannan High School. During his high school years he started reading mystery fiction.

Higashino studied Electrical Engineering at Osaka Prefecture University, where he became captain of the archery club. He graduated with a Bachelor of Engineering degree.

Career 
Higashino started writing while in high school and university, showing his manuscripts to friends.

In 1981 he began working as an engineer at Nippon Denso Co. (presently DENSO), and married a high school teacher. He continued to write in the evenings and on weekends, submitting unpublished mystery novels for consideration for the annual Edogawa Rampo Prize in 1983. In 1984 his submission, which drew on his wife's occupation, reached the final round. In 1985, at the age of 27, he won the Rampo Prize for best unpublished mystery for Hōkago (放課後, After School), drawing on experiences of the archery club at his former university. He resigned from DENSO in 1986 to start a career in Tokyo as a full-time writer.

In 1998 Higashino published Himitsu (秘密, Secret), which was converted into a feature film and won the 52nd Mystery Writers of Japan Award for feature films in 1999. Secret was later translated into English by Kerim Yasar and published as Naoko in 2004, with a limited print run. Higashino was inspired to write the story by reading a book in which a young child possessed the memories of someone who died nearby. He tried writing a short story featuring the implications of what would happen in such an instance, "but the ideas didn’t fully materialize. Finally I presented it as a novel and it got picked up." A 1999 Japanese film, Himitsu, was based on the book, as was a 2007 English-language French remake,The Secret, starring David Duchovny. 

In 2006 Higashino won the 134th Naoki Prize for Yōgisha Ekkusu no Kenshin (容疑者Xの献身, The Devotion of Suspect X), an award for which he'd been nominated five times previously. Suspect X also won the 6th Honkaku Mystery Award and was ranked the number-one novel by Kono Mystery ga Sugoi! 2006 and 2006 Honkaku Mystery Best 10, annual mystery fiction guide books published in Japan. The English edition of Suspect X, translated by Alexander O. Smith, was nominated for the 2012 Edgar Award for Best Novel and the 2012 Barry Award for Best First Novel.

He thought that the book was the end of the Kaga series, as he had done what he wanted to do with it.

Higashino is one of the most popular authors in Asia and, reportedly, the most popular novelist in China. Translation rights for his books, like Suspect X, were sold as far afield as China, Thailand, France, Russia and Spain. Both his The Devotion of Suspect X and Salvation of a Saint were published in 6 languages. His popularity has drawn the attention of Asian academics, with papers and master's theses on his work published in China, Indonesia, Malaysia, and Taiwan, for example, but has also stimulated United States scholars. 

Higashino was elected president of the Mystery Writers of Japan in 2009, and served until 2013. From 2002 to 2007 he served on various MWJ selection committees, and fulfilled a similar role for the Edogawa Rampo Award from 2008 to 2013. In 2014 he became a selection member for the Naoki Prize.

After the Great East Japan Earthquake of 2011, Higashino donated the royalties of 100,000 copies of the reprint of Kirin no Tsubasa (麒麟の翼, The Wings of the Kirin), the sequel to Newcomer, to relief efforts in affected areas.

Higashino reportedly avoids publicity as he prefers people not to recognize him on the street.

Contents and style 
Higashino admitted in 2015 that his content and style had changed from his earlier writings, in which he treated motivation as the most important element. In a 2011 interview he stated that he wants his "readers to be continually surprised by my ideas.” 

In addition to mystery novels, Higashino writes essays and story books for children. His style of writing the latter differs from his novels, and he does not use as many characters as in his novels. Higashino's works often include scientific elements, such as nuclear power generation and brain transplantation. Sports references, such as archery and kendo, ski jumping, and snowboarding, also occur often. 

Suspect X inverts the classical whodunit structure, as the reader learns early on who the murderer is. Andrew Joyce writes in The Wall Street Journal that Higashino explores how "feelings of loyalty and the oppressive weight of human relations" are "catalysts for murder and dark pacts between neighbors or co-workers to dispose of bodies." Higashino claims that Japanese people prefer this format, in which the effects of characters' actions and intentions, in terms of emotions such as guilt and anguish, become clearer only towards the end of the story.

While Higashino admits to liking Western writers, he feels most strongly influenced by Japanese authors such as Edogawa Rampo and Seicho Matsumoto. And "so my work naturally has that Japanese sense of old-fashioned loyalty and concern for human feeling.” With regards his Western readers, Higashino wants them "to read my work and come to understand how Japanese people think, love and hate. I want them to be impressed that there is a Japanese person who came up with such unusual stories."

Works in English translation

Novels
Detective Galileo series
The Devotion of Suspect X (original title: Yōgisha X no Kenshin), trans. Alexander O. Smith (Minotaur Books, 2011)
Salvation of a Saint (original title: Seijo no Kyūsai), trans. Alexander O. Smith (Minotaur Books, 2012)
A Midsummer's Equation (original title: Manatsu no Hōteishiki), trans. Alexander O. Smith (Minotaur Books, 2016)
Silent Parade (original title: Chinmoku no Parēdo), (Minotaur Books, 2021)
Police Detective Kaga series
Malice (original title: Akui), trans. Alexander O. Smith (Minotaur Books, 2014)
Newcomer (original title: Shinzanmono), trans. Giles Murray (Minotaur Books, 2018)
A Death in Tokyo (original title: Kirin no tsubasa), trans. Giles Murray (Minotaur Books, 2022)
Other novels
Naoko (original title: Himitsu), trans. Kerim Yasar (Vertical, 2004)
Journey Under the Midnight Sun (original title: Byakuyakō), trans. Alexander O. Smith (Hachette, 2015)
The Name of the Game is a Kidnapping (original title: Gēmu no Na wa Yūkai), trans. Jan Mitsuko Cash (Vertical, 2017)
The Miracles of the Namiya General Store (original title: Namiya Zakkaten no Kiseki), trans. Sam Bett (Yen On, 2019)

Essay
My Favourite Mystery: Kuroi gashū (黒い画集, The Black Art Book) by Seichō Matsumoto (Mystery Writers of Japan, Inc.)

Awards and nominations

Japanese Mystery Fiction Guide Rankings

 2006 – The Best Japanese Crime Fiction of the Year (Kono Mystery ga Sugoi! 2006): The Devotion of Suspect X
 2010 – The Best Japanese Crime Fiction of the Year (Kono Mystery ga Sugoi! 2010): Shinzanmono (The Newcomer)
 2012 – Ranked as the No. 13 novel on the Top 100 Japanese Mystery Novels of All Time: The Devotion of Suspect X
 2012 – Ranked as the No. 18 novel on the Top 100 Japanese Mystery Novels of All Time: Journey under the Midnight Sun
2018 - Ranked as No. 1 novel on the Weekly Bungeishunjū Mystery Best 10: Chinmoku no Parēdo (沈黙のパレード, Silent Parade)

Bibliography
By 2018 Higashino had published 66 novels, 20 short story collections, and one picture book. In all, there were 715 works in 8 languages by Higashino worldwide in 2020, excluding 20 which were about him.

Detective Galileo (Manabu Yukawa) series
Novels
, 2005 (The Devotion of Suspect X, Minotaur Books, 2011)
, 2008 (Salvation of a Saint, Minotaur Books, 2012)
, 2011 (A Midsummer's Equation, Minotaur Books, 2016)
, 2012 (The Forbidden Magic)
, 2018 (Silent Parade, Minotaur Books, 2021) 
, 2021 (The Transparent Spiral)
Short story collections
, 1998 (Detective Galileo)
, 2000 (Foresight Dream)
, 2008 (The Anguish of Galileo)
, 2012 (The Virtual Clown)

Police Detective Kaga series
Novels
, 1986 (Graduation)
, 1989 (The Forest in Sleep)
, 1996 (Who Killed Her)
, 1996 (Malice, Minotaur Books, 2014)
, 1999 (I Killed Him)
, 2006 (The Red Finger)
, 2009 (Newcomer, Minotaur Books, 2017)
, 2011 (A Death in Tokyo, Minotaur Books, 2022)
, 2013 (When the Curtain of Prayer Descends)
Short story collection
, 2000 (Just One More Lie)

Naniwa Detective Boys series
, 1988, Short story collection (Naniwa Detective Boys)
, 1993, Short story collection (Goodbye, Miss Shinobu)

Detective Daigoro Tenkaichi series
, 1996, Short story collection (The Rule of the Detective)
, 1996, Novel (The Curse of the Detective)

Other novels
, 1985 (After School)
, 1986 (The Murder in Mansion Hakuba)
, 1987 (The Murder in the College Town)
, 1987 (The Case of 11 Letters)
, 1988 (Magic Ball)
, 1988 (Cheers with a Wink)
, 1989 (The Clown of House Juji)
, 1989 (Plan Chojin)
, 1989 (Murder on the Cloud)
, 1989 (Heart of Brutus)
, 1990 (Fate)
, 1990 (The Murder in Mansion Masquerade)
, 1991 (Transformation)
, 1991 (The Murder in Kairotei)
, 1992 (In a Mansion Covered with Snow)
, 1992 (Beautiful Weapon)
, 1993 (Classmate)
, 1993 (Alter Ego)
, 1994 (The Home Where I Died)
, 1994 (The Boy Who Controlled the Rainbow)
, 1995
, 1995 (The Bee in the Sky)
, 1998 (Naoko, Vertical, 2004)
, 1999 (Journey Under the Midnight Sun, Little, Brown, 2015)
, 2001 (One-sided Love)
, 2002
, 2002
, 2002 (The Name of the Game is a Kidnapping, Vertical, 2017)
, 2003 (Letter)
, 2003 (I'm the Ruthless Teacher)
, 2003 (The Door of Murder)
, 2004 (Mysterious Night)
, 2004 (The Hesitating Blade)
, 2006 (The Limit of Mission and Heart)
, 2007 (The Street Where the Dawn Breaks)
, 2007
, 2008 (The Bonds of the Shooting Star)
, 2009
, 2010 (Whose Cuckoo Eggs)
, 2010
, 2010 (Silver Hijack)
, 2011
, 2012 (Miracles of the Namiya General Store)
, 2013 (Dream Flower)
, 2014 (Hollow Cross)
, 2015 (The House Where the Mermaid Sleeps)
, 2015 (Laplace's Witch)
, 2016 (Dangerous Venus)
, 2017 (Masquerade Night)
, 2019 (Thread of Hope)
, 2020 (The Camphor Keeper)

Essay collections
, 1995 (When We Were Stupid)
, 2004 (Challenge?)
, 2005 (Science?)
, 2006 (Dreams over Turin)
, 2007 (Probably the Last Greeting)

Other short story collections
, 1990 (Detective Club)
, 1990 (A Night of Murder with no Murderer)
, 1991 (A Night of the Traffic Officer)
, 1994 (Suspicious People)
, 1995 (Weird Laughs Novel)
, 1996 (Poisonous Laughs Novel)
, 2001 (Super-Murder: The Anguish of the Mystery Writers)
, 2005 (Dark Laughs Novel)
, 2011 (Someone of Those Days)
, 2012 (Crooked Laughs Novel)
, 2014 (Masquerade Eve)

Children's book
, 2001 (Illustrated by Hiromi Sugita)

Comics 
 HE∀DS (ヘッズ), 4 volumes, 2003 (Illustrated by Motorō Mase)

TV and film adaptations
Some of his novels have been made into TV drama series and films:

Japanese films
Naoko (1999, Original Title: Himitsu, 1998)
g@me. (2003, Original Title: Gēmu no Na wa Yūkai, 2002)
Lakeside Murder Case (2004, Original Title: Lakeside, 2002)
Henshin (2005)
Tegami (2006)
Suspect X (2008) 
The Hovering Blade (2009, Original Title: Samayou Yaiba, 2004)
Into the White Night (2011)
Yoake no Machi de (2011)
The Wings of the Kirin (2012)
Platinum Data (2013)
Midsummer's Equation (2013)
Broken | Banghwanghaneun Kalnal (2014)
The Big Bee | Tenku no Hachi (2015)
Shippu Rondo (2016)
Miracles of the Namiya General Store | Namiya Zakkaten no Kiseki (2017)
The House Where The Mermaid Sleeps | Ningyo no Nemuru Ie (2018)
The Crimes That Bind | Inori no Maku ga Oriru Toki (2018)
Laplace's Witch | Rapurasu no Majo (2018)
Masquerade Hotel (2019)
Parallel World Love Story (2019)
Masquerade Night (2021)
Silent Parade (2022)

Japanese TV dramas
Tokio chichi e no dengon (2004 Aug–Sep, Original Title: Tokio, 2002)
Byakuyakō (2006)
Galileo (2007 and 2008, Original Title: Tantei Galileo, 1998, Yochimu, 2000, and Galileo no Kunō, 2008)
Ryūsei no Kizuna (2008)
Meitantei no Okite (2009)
Himitsu (2010)
Shinzanmono (2010)
Higashino Keigo Mysteries (2012, Original Title: Hannin no Inai Satsujin no Yoru, 1990, Ayashii Hitobito, 1994, and Ano Koro no Dareka, 2011)
Galileo II (2013 and SP, 2013, Original Title: Seijo no Kyūsai, 2008, Galileo no Kunō, 2008, Kyozō no Dōkeshi, 2012, and Kindan no Majutsu, 2012)
Dangerous Venus (2020)
The Forbidden Magic (2022)

South Korean films
White Night (2009)
Perfect Number (2012)
Broken (2014)

French film
The Secret (2007, based on Himitsu; French title: Si J'etais Toi, meaning "If I Were You")

Chinese film
Namiya (2007, based on Namiya Zakkaten no Kiseki)
Indian film
Monica, O My Darling ( Hindi language 2022 film based on Burutasu No Shinzou)

See also

Japanese detective fiction
Mystery Writers of Japan
Edogawa Rampo Prize
Naoki Prize
Honkaku Mystery Award

References

External links
J'Lit | Authors : Keigo Higashino | Books from Japan

1958 births
20th-century Japanese novelists
21st-century Japanese novelists
Japanese mystery writers
Naoki Prize winners
Mystery Writers of Japan Award winners
Edogawa Rampo Prize winners
Honkaku Mystery Award winners
Living people
Writers from Osaka